The 33rd Blue Dragon Film Awards ceremony was held on November 30, 2012 at the Sejong Center for the Performing Arts in Seoul. Presented by Sports Chosun, it was broadcast on SBS and was hosted by Kim Hye-soo and Yoo Jun-sang.

Nominations and winners
Complete list of nominees and winners:

(Winners denoted in bold)

References

2012 film awards
Blue Dragon Film Awards
2012 in South Korean cinema